René Claude Simard, (born February 28, 1961) is a pop singer from Quebec. He is the older brother of Nathalie Simard.

Early life
Simard was born in Chicoutimi, Quebec.

Career
In 1974, René Simard was awarded the Grand Prix by Frank Sinatra at the annual Tokyo Music Festival. In Canada, he hosted the CBC Television series, The René Simard Show, from 1977 to 1979.

Simard is also an occasional actor. He played the henchman Stu in the 1995 film Kids of the Round Table.

Between 2006 and 2008, he hosted the television series L'heure de gloire on Radio-Canada.

Simard was formerly managed by Guy Cloutier as well as his sister Nathalie. In 2004, Cloutier was convicted of sexually assaulting Nathalie when she was a child. Michel Vastel's 2005 book on the case, Briser le silence (Breaking the Silence), alleged that René co-operated with Cloutier in trying to hide the assaults. In 2005, Simard made a public statement in which he denied this.

In 1999 he briefly played the role of The Phantom in the Toronto production of The Phantom of the Opera (April to May 23, 1999). He was succeeded by Paul Stanley.   

Simard has been married to TV hostess Marie-Josée Taillefer since 1987.

In 2014, Simard was named a Member of the Order of Canada "[f]or his contributions to the development of Quebec culture as a performer, host and director."

References

External links

Singer René Simard denies helping hide sister's abuse, CBC News, November 18, 2005

 Queen's University Directory of CBC Television Series  (The René Simard Show archived listing link via archive.org)

1961 births
Canadian male singers
Canadian pop singers
French Quebecers
Living people
Musicians from Saguenay, Quebec
Singers from Quebec
French-language singers of Canada
Members of the Order of Canada